The 1953 Paddington North by-election was held on 3 December 1953, after the resignation of the incumbent Labour MP Bill Field, who had failed to overturn a conviction for "importuning for immoral purposes". The seat was retained by the Labour candidate, Ben Parkin, a left-wing former MP for Stroud.

References

Paddington North by-election
Paddington North by-election
Paddington North,1953
Paddington North,1953
Paddington